Diogo Miguel Pacheco Ferreira (born 30 July 1990 in Queluz) is a Portuguese athlete specialising in the pole vault. He won the gold medal at the 2017 Summer Universiade. In addition, he represented his country at the 2017 World Championships without clearing any height.

His personal bests in the event are 5.71 metres outdoors (Lisbon 2017) and 5.60 metres indoors (Potsdam 2015) The former is the current national record.

International competitions

1No mark in the final

References

1990 births
Living people
People from Queluz, Portugal
Portuguese male pole vaulters
World Athletics Championships athletes for Portugal
Universiade medalists in athletics (track and field)
S.L. Benfica athletes
Universiade gold medalists for Portugal
Medalists at the 2017 Summer Universiade
Sportspeople from Lisbon District